George Gray (25 December 1887 – 11 December 1970) was a British hurdler. He competed in the men's 110 metres hurdles at the 1920 Summer Olympics.

References

External links
 

1887 births
1970 deaths
Athletes (track and field) at the 1920 Summer Olympics
British male hurdlers
Olympic athletes of Great Britain
Place of birth missing